Zbizuby is a municipality and village in Kutná Hora District in the Central Bohemian Region of the Czech Republic. It has about 500 inhabitants.

Administrative parts
Villages and hamlets of Hroznice, Koblasko, Makolusky, Nechyba, Vestec, Vlková and Vranice are administrative parts of Zbizuby.

References

Villages in Kutná Hora District